Ruza is a town and the administrative center of Ruzsky District in Moscow Oblast, Russia, located on the Ruza River (a tributary of the Moskva River)  west of Moscow.  Population:

History
It was first mentioned in 1339 as a part of the Principality of Zvenigorod. It became a part of the Grand Duchy of Moscow in the early 16th century. The town was a fortress which protected Moscow from the west. During World War II, Ruza was occupied by the Germans from October 25, 1941 to January 17, 1942.

Administrative and municipal status
Within the framework of administrative divisions, Ruza serves as the administrative center of Ruzsky District. As an administrative division, it is incorporated within Ruzsky District as the Town of Ruza. As a municipal division, the Town of Ruza is incorporated within Ruzsky Municipal District as Ruza Urban Settlement.

Notable residents 

Sergey Ivanov (1864–1910), painter
Aleksandr Shcherbakov (1901–1945),  politician)

References

Notes

Sources

Cities and towns in Moscow Oblast
Ruzsky Uyezd